KACT (1360 AM) is a radio station broadcasting a country music format. Licensed to Andrews, Texas, United States, the station is currently owned by Jessica May Reid and Gerald K. Reid, through licensee Andrews Broadcasting Company Inc., and features programming from Westwood One .

KACT now airs talk radio, local and regional sports.

KACT is one of the stations founded in the late 1950s by State Senator Marshall Formby.

References

External links

ACT
Radio stations established in 1955
1955 establishments in Texas